Charles Horatio "Soc" McMorris (August 31, 1890 – February 11, 1954) was an American rear admiral during World War II, most notably commanding forces at the Battle of the Komandorski Islands during the Aleutian Islands Campaign.

Early life and career
Born in Wetumpka, Alabama, McMorris attended public schools in Wetumpka for several years before entering the United States Naval Academy on June 26, 1908. He also served aboard the battleship , which salvaged the submarine  following its sinking off the coast of Honolulu, Hawaii in 1915.

World War I
A junior officer during World War I, McMorris saw combat in the Atlantic aboard the destroyers  and  prior his promotion to lieutenant in 1918. During the inter-war years, McMorris was stationed in various sea and shore posts before his graduation from the Naval War College in 1938, serving as operations officer to the Hawaiian-based US fleet from 1939 until 1941.

World War II
Appointed war plans officer to the United States Pacific Fleet following the attack on Pearl Harbor, McMorris remained in this post until April 1942 when he was assigned command of Task Force 8 led by the cruiser . After engaging the Imperial Japanese Navy several times, both in the Aleutian Islands Campaign, specifically at the Battle of the Komandorski Islands and (as well as winning distinction for bravery and the award of the Navy Cross during the Battle of Cape Esperance on October 11–12, 1942), McMorris was named Chief of Staff of the Pacific Fleet in June 1943, as well as a personal advisor to Admiral Chester Nimitz, a post in which he would remain until the end of the war.

Post-war
Briefly serving as vice admiral from September 23, 1944 until July 1948, McMorris would serve as commander of the United States Fourth Fleet and President of the General Board, before assuming command of Pearl Harbor's Fourteenth Naval District on August 25, 1948. McMorris would eventually command the Pearl Harbor naval base before retiring to Marietta, Pennsylvania, where he lived until his death in 1954.

Namesake
The destroyer escort  was named for McMorris.

Decorations

References

 Parrish, Thomas and S. L. A. Marshall, ed. The Simon and Schuster Encyclopedia of World War II, New York: Simon and Schuster, 1978.

External links
USS McMorris – Vice Admiral Charles Horatio McMorris, USN

1890 births
1954 deaths
People from Wetumpka, Alabama
United States Navy vice admirals
United States Naval Academy alumni
United States Navy personnel of World War I
United States Navy World War II admirals
Aleutian Islands campaign
Recipients of the Navy Cross (United States)
Recipients of the Navy Distinguished Service Medal
Recipients of the Legion of Merit